Kerrie Lamont Holley is an American software architect, author, researcher, consultant, and inventor.  He recently joined Industry Solutions, Google Cloud. Previously he was with UnitedHealth Group / Optum, their first Technical Fellow, where he focused on ideating healthcare assets and solutions using IoT, AI, graph database and more.  His main focus centered on advancing AI in healthcare with an emphasis on deep learning and natural language processing. Holley is a retired IBM Fellow. Holley served as vice president and CTO at Cisco responsible for their analytics and automation platform. Holley is known internationally for his innovative work in architecture and software engineering centered on the adoption of scalable services, next era computing, service-oriented architecture and APIs.

Biography

Early life and education 
Holley was raised by his maternal grandmother on Chicago's south side. He became a student at the Sue Duncan Children's Center in 1961 where he was tutored in math and science.  As he excelled in the program, he became a tutor at the center, later tutoring former United States Secretary of Education, Arne Duncan and actor Michael Clarke Duncan. After graduating from Kenwood Academy in 1972, Holley went on to receive his Bachelor of Arts in mathematics from DePaul University in Chicago; followed by a Juris Doctor Degree in 1982 from DePaul University College of Law. In 2016, Holley was conferred a Doctor of Humane Letters from DePaul University, College of Communication / College of Computing and Digital Media.

Career
Holley joined IBM in 1986 as an advisory systems engineer. In 1990 he became an analytics consultant with IBM's consulting group, now called IBM Global Business Services. He was appointed chief technology officer of IBM's GBS, AIS and IBM's SOA Center of Excellence where he works with clients to create flexible applications that enable companies to respond to rapidly changing markets. SOA (service-oriented architecture) is a software design methodology based on structured collections of discrete software modules, known as services, that collectively provide the complete functionality of a large or complex software application.  Kerrie’s engineering work addressed one of the biggest world-wide challenges in enterprise software system development: future-proofing.  He is one of the early pioneers of thinking, practices and tools for evolving software architectures via service oriented architecture (SOA) for engineering large complex enterprise systems.

For his work Holley was recognized as an IBM Fellow. In 2000 he was appointed to IBM Distinguished Engineer and in that same year elected to IBM's Academy of Technology for his sustained contributions in designing high performance financial services applications. Holley is a co-patent owner of the industry's first SOA method and SOA maturity model, which helps companies develop SOA-based applications and infrastructures. Holley's experience with cognitive services and analytics at IBM prompted Cisco to ask him to join, to mature their analytics software and automation portfolio focused on machine learning and streaming analytics.  In 2016, the opportunity and challenge to contribute to UnitedHealth Group mission to help people live healthier lives and make health care work better made an easy decision for him to join Optum Technology.  At Optum, Holley focused on advancing UnitedHealth Group in several strategic technology imperatives. While at Optum he led the UnitedHealth Group Fellow, Distinguished Engineer, and Principal Engineer Technical Leadership Career Program.

Awards and honors

 2003 		Black Engineer of the Year 
 2004 		The 50 Most Important Blacks in Research Science 
 2005-2010 	Naval Studies Board member 
 2006 		IBM Fellow, 2nd African American to be appointed in 100 years
 2007              Most Important Blacks in Technology
 2009              Most Important Blacks in Technology
 2011 		Red Herring 100 Global Award Finalist
 2012 		IBM Master Inventor
 2016 		Honorary Doctorate Degree and Commencement Speaker, DePaul University 
 2016 		UHG and Optum Fellow
 2023 		National Academy of Engineering

Work

IBM Fellow 
Holley was a Fellow in the Thomas J. Watson Research Center focused on scalable business services and API economy. Previously, he served as a CTO for IBM Global Business Services. In 2006 he was named an IBM Fellow, the company's highest technical leadership position. The Fellows program, founded by Thomas J. Watson in 1962, promotes creativity among IBM's most exceptional technical professionals. The IBM Fellow recognition is the most prestigious recognition in the IBM technical community where the criteria for appointment includes:
 Distinguished, sustained record of technical achievements (usually a creative contribution to science and technology, landmarks to IBM) and a strong potential for continuing contributions to IBM's growth and stature.

Technical abilities considered are:

 Originality and creativity
 Inventive activities
 Insight into the technical field of expertise
 Consulting effectiveness and leadership
 Technical publications
 Professional society contributions

The criteria for appointment are stringent and take into account only the most significant technical achievements. Appointment as an IBM Fellow, is made by the chairman, president and chief executive officer, and is a career designation.  Since 1963, IBM shows a directory of 325 IBM Fellows appointments of which 102 are active as of April 2021.

Publications

Holley's most recent book, AI First Healthcare, was published by O'Reilly Media in 2021.  In November 2010 Holley's first book "100 SOA Questions: Asked and Answered" was published. The book describes how enterprises can adopt service-oriented architecture. His next book "Is Your Company Ready for Cloud", co-authored with Pam Isom, was released in 2012.

Patents
Holley owns several patents ranging from how to maintain functionality when faced with component failure, to how to locate lost mobile devices and software engineering patents in service-oriented architecture. Holley is a co-patent owner of the industry's first SOA development method and first SOA maturity model. The maturity model helps enterprises assess where they are on the road to adopting a Service-Oriented Architecture and provides a plan for achieving an SOA-based infrastructure.

Selected publications 
 Holley, Kerrie, and Siupo Becker. AI First Healthcare. O'Reilly Media, 2021.
 Holley, Kerrie, and Ali Arsanjani. 100 SOA Questions: Asked and Answered. Pearson Education, 2010.
Articles, a selection:
 Channabasavaiah, Kishore, Kerrie Holley, and Edward Tuggle. "Migrating to a service-oriented architecture." IBM DeveloperWorks 16 (2003).
 Crawford, C. H., Bate, G. P., Cherbakov, L., Holley, K., & Tsocanos, C. (2005). Toward an on demand service-oriented architecture." IBM Systems Journal, 44(1), 81-107.
 Arsanjani, A., Ghosh, S., Allam, A., Abdollah, T., Ganapathy, S., & Holley, K. (2008). "SOMA: A method for developing service-oriented solutions." IBM systems Journal, 47(3), 377–396.

References

External links
 The Sue Duncan Children's Center
 
 Article: The Great SOA IBM Man
 Book:  100 SOA Questions Asked and Answered
 Patents
 Bloomberg:  Watson Has Real World Uses
 IBM GBS CTO Talks Cloud
 API Economy
 DePaul 2016 Commencement - Live Stream

IBM Fellows
African-American engineers
21st-century American engineers
African-American inventors
20th-century American inventors
21st-century American inventors
African-American scientists
Software engineering researchers
American computer scientists
Living people
DePaul University College of Law alumni
1954 births
21st-century African-American people
20th-century African-American people